Roland is a rural municipality located in the Pembina Valley Region of Manitoba, Canada. According to the Canada 2016 Census, it has a population of 1,129.

Communities
Graham
Jordan
Kronsgart
Myrtle
Roland

Demographics 

Notable people
 Mary Dunn ( Armitage; 1903–1965), Canadian sports executive

External links
 Official website

References

 Manitoba Historical Society - Rural Municipality of Roland
 Roland RM, MB Community Profile
 Map of Roland R.M. at Statcan

Rural municipalities in Manitoba